Ziegler Island (Russian: Остров Циглера; Ostrov Tsiglera) is an island in Franz Josef Land, Russia.

Geography
Cape Brice (мыс Брайса) marks the northwestern corner. Cape Washington (мыс Вашингтона) lies in the very east. The southernmost point is called Cape Belousov (мыс Белоусова).

Adjacent islands
Ziegler Island is part of the Zichy Land subgroup of the Franz Josef Archipelago. Booth Channel (пролив Бута) separates it from Payer Island and Greely Island to the north. Salisbury Island lies across Rhodes Channel (пролив Родса) to the south. To the east, beyond Collinson Channel (пролив Коллинсона), is Wiener Neustadt Island.

History
The southeast of Ziegler Island was sighted by the Austro-Hungarian North Pole expedition in 1874. Co-expedition leader Julius Payer presumed that it was connected to the other islands of Zichy Land.

The exploration done by the 1894-1897 Jackson-Harmsworth expedition reduced the supposed landmass of Zichy Land appearing on the maps considerably. Jackson sighted Ziegler Island from the northwest and named Cape Brice after , the expedition's secretary.

The 1901-1902 Baldwin-Ziegler Polar Expedition on ships America, Frithjof, and Belgica named Cape Washington and were the first to set foot on the island. In May 1902  ascertained that Ziegler Island was a distinct entity. He named the island after the expedition sponsor, New York businessman William Ziegler. Ziegler was also the sponsor behind the 1903–1905 Ziegler-Fiala Polar Expedition that improved upon Baldwin's map.

The Austrian observing site Payer–Weyprecht (probably ) was established around the start of the 20th century on this island.

See also 
 List of islands of Russia
 William Barr, The First Cruise into the Soviet Arctic.

References

External links 
Island Names in Russian
Arctic expeditions: 
Ziegler Island - Franz-Josef-Land on www.franz-josef-land.info

Islands of Franz Josef Land
Uninhabited islands of Russia